The Sheffield Outrages were a series of explosions and murders by a small group of trade unionist militants carried out in Sheffield, England in the 1860s.

Sheffield's early success in steel production had involved long working hours, in conditions which offered little or no safety protection. In The Condition of the Working Class in England in 1844, Friedrich Engels quotes a local doctor, Dr. Knight, regarding the so-called "Grinder's Asthma" suffered by the Sheffield cutlery workers in the mid 19th century:

The city became one of the main centres for trade union organisation and agitation in the United Kingdom.

By the mid-late 1860s the majority of the objectives of the Chartist movement had been frustrated. These social and political reformers had not accomplished all they had hoped to, although they had succeeded in lobbying for the establishment of the first town council in 1843. (Eventually, the great majority of the items of their 'charter' did, in fact, become law).

Social and working conditions in industrial England were not showing any significant improvement and the - as yet unrecognised - trade unions struggled to protect the interests of their members. These conditions provoked great discontent and eventually militant action. In some isolated incidents, workmen even began to use violence to punish employers and also those fellow-workers who would not become union members: the so-called "Sheffield Outrages".

The trade unions themselves sought a formal inquiry to establish the facts of the matter, largely as a result of accusations in the newspapers of complicity in these outrages resulting from investigations by W. C. Leng of the Sheffield Daily Telegraph. On 17 November 1866 a delegation, which included members of the Sheffield Trades Council and the London Trades Council, requested that the Home Secretary take the necessary measures to investigate.

This led to a Special Commission of Enquiry into these occurrences in May 1867. Immunity was offered to all who gave evidence and, as a result a number of people were encouraged to testify. Among these was William Broadhead, the Secretary of the Sawgrinders' Union at that time, who described how he had paid two workmen £15 to murder a man called Linley. Linley had taken on too many apprentices, which was, in practice, a method of acquiring cheap labour.

References

External links
Events that led to the first TUC tuc.org.uk.
 Sources for the study of the Sheffield Outrages Produced by Sheffield City Council's Libraries and Archives

History of Sheffield
1860s in England
1866 in England
1867 in England
1866 labor disputes and strikes
1867 labor disputes and strikes
19th century in Yorkshire
Labour disputes in England
Murder in Yorkshire
Explosions in England
British trade unions history